Fórnoles or Fórnols de Matarranya is a municipality located in the Matarraña/Matarranya comarca, province of Teruel, Aragon, Spain. According to the 2004 census (INE), the municipality has a population of 103 inhabitants.

References 

Municipalities in the Province of Teruel
Matarraña/Matarranya